Howard Waugh (February 24, 1931 – November 29, 2009) was an all-star and record setting halfback who played in the Western Interprovincial Football Union with the Calgary Stampeders.

A graduate of the University of Tulsa, Waugh joined the Calgary Stampeders in 1954. He made Canadian football history when he became the first player to officially rush for more than 1,000 yards in a season (1043). His promising all-star career was interrupted with two years of military service. Waugh returned to the Stamps for one final season, and in 1957 he rushed for 499 yards and two touchdowns and added eight catches for 122 yards.

Waugh later worked with IBM and had a long career in house construction, his most passionate and rewarding career as construction supervisor for Tulsa Habitat for Humanity.  He died November 27, 2009, age 78.

See also
 List of college football yearly rushing leaders

References

1931 births
2009 deaths
People from Grenada, Mississippi
Calgary Stampeders players
Tulsa Golden Hurricane football players
Players of American football from Mississippi
American football running backs
Canadian football running backs
American players of Canadian football